(born April 16, 1988) is a Japanese model, actress, and singer from Saitama Prefecture.

History
She is most famous for her role as Mio Kuroki in the Sailor Moon live action show Pretty Guardian Sailor Moon. Her mother is of Japanese descent, while her father is an American of English descent. She is fluent in both English and Japanese. Alisa also starred in the music video Koibito by Japanese rock band, Kishidan. Her current modeling agency is Junes.

Personal life
Alisa is currently married to Japanese singer Manabu Taniguti, who is known by his stage name Mah and is the vocalist of alternative metal-band SiM. The couple have a son together. Alisas hobbies include taking sticker pictures and shopping.

Actress - Filmography

TV series 
 GARO (2005/2006) - Superhero action/adventure. As Shizuka.
 Pretty Guardian Sailor Moon (2003/2005) - TV Live Action Series. As Mio Kuroki.
 V Jump TV - Channel BB as a regular MC

DVD 

 2002: Just a Princess
 2006: Audrey

Photo books 

 2002: Just a Princess
 2002: Suhada no Alisa
 We Want to be a Model

External links
  Official Blog
 

1988 births
Living people
Actors from Saitama Prefecture
Japanese child actresses
Japanese television actresses
Japanese television personalities
Japanese people of American descent
Japanese people of English descent
Musicians from Saitama Prefecture
21st-century Japanese actresses
21st-century Japanese singers
21st-century Japanese women singers